Daýançgylyç Urazow is a Turkmen football striker who played for Turkmenistan in the 2004 AFC Asian Cup.

References 

Living people
Turkmenistan footballers
Turkmenistan international footballers
Association football forwards
Year of birth missing (living people)
Place of birth missing (living people)